Diane E. Pataki is a Foundation Professor and Director of the School of Sustainability at Arizona State University. She is an elected Fellow of the American Geophysical Union, the Ecological Society of America, and the American Association for the Advancement of Science. She was a recipient of the James B. Macelwane Medal in 2008 from the American Geophysical Union for her research on coupled water and carbon cycles. The award is given to “significant contributions to the geophysical sciences by an outstanding early career scientist.”

Early life and education 
Diane E. Pataki was born in New York City, NY. She attended Jamaica High School and was included in the first group of students to participate in the Gateway to Higher Education (program) which started in 1986. The Gateway program allowed for students to receive extra exposure and mentorship in science and math. Pataki has cited this as what inspired her to pursue scientific research. Pataki took extra science, research and writing classes at the City University of New York.

Pataki graduated from Barnard College with a major in Environmental Science in 1993. During this time she worked as an intern at the headquarters of the Environmental Defense Fund assisting the executive director, Fred Krupp.

Pataki attended the Duke University Nicholas School of the Environment to pursue a M.S. and Ph.D. under Professor Ram Oren. Her dissertation is titled "Water use of co-occurring species in response to environmental conditions at varying temporal scales". Her two post-doctoral mentors were James Coleman at the Desert Research Institute and James Ehleringer at the University of Utah.

Career and research 
After her doctoral and post-doctoral research, Pataki joined the faculty of the University of California, Irvine in 2004. While at UCI, she was the founding Director of the Center for the Environmental Biology and the Steele Burnard Anza Borrego Desert Research Center in 2011.

Pataki moved to the University of Utah in 2012 as an associate professor in the Department of Biology as well as adjunct faculty in the Department of City & Metropolitan Planning. She service as the Associate Vice President of Research at the University of Utah from 2019-2021. From 2014 to 2015, she served as a Program Director in the Division of Environmental Biology at the National Science Foundation. Pataki was also a member of the United States Environmental Protection Agency Board of Scientific Counselors until 2017.

Diane's earlier research under Ram Oren while at Duke University focused on controls of canopy conductance in temperate forest species. She now specializes in land-atmosphere exchange, ecohydrology, biogeochemical cycles, and ecosystem services in urban environments. She has done extensive work on the use of carbon isotopes for source apportionment of urban carbon dioxide fluxes.

Diane participated the Leopold Environmental Leadership Program in 2015. She currently serves on the NSF Advisory Committee on Environmental Research and Education.

Service 

 Vice President for Science, Ecological Society of America, 2019-
 Member of the National Science Foundation Directorate for Biological Sciences Advisory Committee 2017–2021
Member of the National Science Foundation Advisory Committee on Environmental Research and Education 2018–present
 Program Director in the National Science Foundation Division of Environmental Biology 2014-2015
 Member of the United States Environmental Protection Agency Board of Scientific Counselors 2011-2017

Awards 
 Fulbright Global Scholar, U.S. Fulbright Program
 2021 Fellow of the American Association for the Advancement of Science  
 2015 Fellow of the Leopold Leadership Program  
 2008 James B. Macelwane Medal, American Geophysical Union 
 2008 Fellow of the American Geophysical Union 
 1996 NASA Earth Science Summer School Fellowship
 1993 Lillian Berle Dare Award. Barnard College, Columbia University  
 1993 Rice Prize in geology. Barnard College, Columbia University

Selected publications 
Diane E Pataki publications indexed by Google Scholar:

 Pataki, D.E. (2015). Grand challenges in urban ecology. Frontiers in Ecology and Evolution. Vol. 3, doi: 10.3389/fevo.2015.00057. Published, 06/2015. https://www.frontiersin.org/articles/10.3389/fevo.2015.00057/full
 Avolio ML, Pataki DE, Pincetl S, Gillespie TW, Jenerette GD, McCarthy HR. (2015). Understanding preferences for tree attributes: the relative effects of socio-economic and local environmental factors. Urban Ecosystems 18(1):73-86. Published, 03/2015.
 Pataki DE, Carreiro MM, Cherrier J, Grulke NE, Jenning V, Pincetl S, Pouyat RV, Whitlow TH, Zipperer WC. (2011). Coupling biogeochemical cycles in urban environments: Ecosystem services, green solutions, and misconceptions. Frontiers in Ecology and the Environment 9: 27–36. Published, 02/2011
 Pataki DE, Bowling DR, Ehleringer JR. (2003). Seasonal cycle of carbon dioxide and its isotopic composition in an urban atmosphere: anthropogenic and biogenic effects. JGR Atmospheres. 108(D23), 4735, doi:10.1029/2003JD003865. Published, 12/2003.

References

Year of birth missing (living people)
Living people
University of California, Irvine faculty
Barnard College alumni
Duke University alumni
People from New York (state)
University of Utah faculty